Bielitz District was a political district (equivalent to powiat in Poland) in Austrian Silesia of the Austrian Empire (and since 1867 of Austria-Hungary) existing between 1850–1855 and 1868–1920. Seat of its 
district captaincy and administrative center was the city of Bielitz (now Bielsko-Biała, Poland).

History 
Revolutions of 1848 in the Austrian Empire led to various social, legal and also administrative reforms. In late December 1849, Austrian Silesia was re-established and was initially subdivided into seven political districts, including one with the seat in Bielitz. Political districts were additionally divided into legal districts (German: Gerichtsbezirk). Bielitz political district consisted of three legal districts: Bielitz, Skotschau (Skoczów) and Schwarzwasser (Strumień). In the era of Bach's neo-absolutism political districts were abolished and replaced by district offices (German: Bezirksamt) encompassing territories of the abolished legal districts. Political districts were re-established in 1868. Two years later the town of Bielitz was excluded from the district to form statutory city, but remained the seat of the district. After this the area of the district did not change significantly and up to 1920 was encompassing 758 km² divided into 67 municipalities (17 in Bielitz legal district, 15 in Schwarzwasser, 34 in Skotschau).

According to the censuses conducted in 1880, 1890, 1900 and 1910 the population was as follows:

Traditionally the territory of those two legal districts was inhabited partly by Cieszyn Vlachs especially around Skotschau, speaking Cieszyn Silesian and Bielsko with surrounding villages was forming a German language island (German: Bielitz-Bialaer Sprachinsel). The results of those censuses and factors shaping national identity of the local population became a perennial subject of the political squabbles in the region. In addition to the Polish and German national orientations there was another group living in the area, the Ślązakowcy, who advocated a distinct Silesian national identity. Throughout Cieszyn Silesia this group enjoyed especially popular support among Protestants living in the district.

Additionally in terms of religion in 1910 the population with permanent residence consisted of Roman Catholics (52,456 or 63.3%), Protestants (28,760 or 34.7%), Jews (1,533 or 1.9%).

After World War I and fall of Austria-Hungary the region of Cieszyn Silesia including the territory of Bielitz political district became disputed land between Czechoslovakia and Poland. Local Germans also had a different aspirations. This led to Polish–Czechoslovak War and the division of the region and district on 28 July 1920, by a decision of the Spa Conference. The district of Bielitz/Bielsko as a whole became a part of Poland and was transformed into Bielsko County, without excluded part of municipalities of the former Skotschau/Skoczów legal district that were transferred to Cieszyn County.

Municipal division 
As of 1910:

Bielitz legal district (Gerichtsbezirk Bielitz)
 Alexanderfeld
 Alt Bielitz
 Batzdorf
 Bistrai
 Braunau
 Czechowitz
 Dziedzitz
 Ellgoth
 Ernsdorf
 Heinzendorf
 Kamitz
 Nieder Kurzwald
 Ober Kurzwald
 Lobnitz
 Matzdorf
 Nikelsdorf
 Zabrzeg

Schwarzwasser legal district (Gerichtsbezirk Schwarzwasser)
 Bonkau
 Chybi
 Drahomischl
 Fröhlichhof
 Illownitz
 Landek
 Mnich
 Ochab
 Pruchna
 Riegersdorf
 Schwarzwasser (town)
 Zablacz
 Zaborz
 Zarzicz
 Zbitkau

Skotschau legal district  (Gerichtsbezirk Skotschau)
 Baumgarten
 Bielowitzko
 Brenna
 Godzischau
 Golleschau
 Grodzietz
 Klein Gurek
 Gross Gurek
 Harbutowitz
 Hermanitz
 Iskrzyczyn
 Kisielau
 Kitschitz
 Kostkowitz
 Kowali
 Nieder Kozakowitz
 Ober Kozakowitz
 Lazy
 Lippowetz
 Lonczka
 Miendzyswietz
 Nierodzim
 Perstetz
 Pogorz
 Rostropitz
 Schimoradz
 Skotschau (town)
 Swientoszuwka
 Ustron M. (market town)
 Weichsel
 Wieszczont
 Willamowitz
 Wislitz
 Zeislowitz

References 

Districts of Austria
Habsburg Silesia
Cieszyn Silesia